{{Infobox chef 
| image =
| name = Elia Aboumrad
| caption = chef Elia Aboumrad
| birth_date  =
| birth_place = Mexico City, Mexico
| death_date  =
| death_place =
| style =
| education = 
| restaurants = GORGE 
| television = Top Chef}}

Elia Aboumrad (born in Mexico City, Mexico) is a Mexican chef and former Top Chef contestant.

Biography
Aboumrad studied at Ecole Lenôtre. After earning Le Cordon Bleu's 'Grand Diplôme', Aboumrad went on to work under Joël Robuchon in Paris. After several years of training and service, she became his first female Sous Chef. She then moved to Las Vegas to open his restaurants at the MGM Grand Hotel. Later, she was recruited as executive chef of The Café at The Hotel at Mandalay Bay. The Hotel garnered its fourth AAA Diamond under her regime.

Aboumrad appeared on reality TV show Top Chef on Bravo during its second season and was one of the final four contestants when she was eliminated from the competition. In 2009, she was awarded the internationally recognized 'Universal Excellency Award' for her dedication to the culinary arts. Aboumrad also competed as a contestant on Top Chef: All Stars'' in 2010, but she was eliminated in the first episode.

In September 2012, Aboumrad and Uyen Nguyen opened GORGE, a charcuterie house and wine bar, on the famous Sunset Strip in West Hollywood, California.

Personal life
Aboumrad is Mexican and of Lebanese heritage

References

Living people
Women chefs
Mexican people of Lebanese descent
Top Chef contestants
Chefs from Mexico City
Year of birth missing (living people)